Curium(III) fluoride or curium trifluoride is the chemical compound composed of curium and fluorine with the formula CmF3. It is a white, nearly insoluble salt that has the same crystal structure as LaF3. It precipitates as a hydrate when fluoride ions are added to a weakly acidic Cm(III) solution; alternatively it can be synthesized by reacting hydrofluoric acid with Cm(OH)3. The anhydrous form is then obtained by desiccation or by treatment with hydrogen fluoride gas.

References

Curium compounds
Fluorides